Gopalpur is a small Village/hamlet in Yadgir Taluk in Yadgir District of Karnataka, India. It comes under Gopalpur Panchayath. It belongs to Gulbarga Division. It is located 1 km towards East from District headquarters Yadgir. 497 km from state capital Bangalore

Gopalpur postal code is 585321 and postal head office is Ramasamudra (Yadgir).

Gopalpur is surrounded by Shahapur Taluk to the west, Wadi Taluk to the north, Narayanpet Taluk to the east and Damaragidda Taluk to the east. Cities nearby Gopalpur include Yadgir, Shahpur, Wadi and Narayanpet.

Demographics
Kannada is the local language. The total population of Gopalpur is 923, comprising 453 males and 470 females and living in 176 houses. The total area of Gopalpur is 535 hectares.

See also
 Yadgir

Notes

External links 
 

Villages in Yadgir district